"Turn On the Night" is a song by the American rock band Kiss from their 1987 studio album Crazy Nights. It was the album's third and final single.

Background and writing 
The song was written by Paul Stanley and Diane Warren. As she says, she hadn't written many hits at that time, but Paul Stanley believed in her. Stanley in his turn says that it was Warren who came up with the title for the song and that she played the key role in its writing.

Music video 
The music video was directed by Marty Callner. It was shot in Worcester, Massachusetts on January 27, 1988.

Commercial performance 
"Turn On the Night" charted only in the UK, where it reached #41.

Charts

References

External links 
 "Turn On the Night" at Discogs

1987 songs
1987 singles
Kiss (band) songs
Mercury Records singles
Songs written by Paul Stanley
Songs written by Diane Warren
Song recordings produced by Ron Nevison
Music videos directed by Marty Callner